HS665 is a drug which acts as a potent and selective κ-opioid receptor agonist, and has analgesic effects in animal studies. HS665 is not an agonist for the mu receptor, leading to less potential for abuse.

References 

Kappa-opioid receptor agonists
Phenyl compounds